Mohammad Salehi (also Romanized as Moḩammad Şāleḩī and Muhammad Sālehī; also known as Mehmad Sādī, Muhammad Sa-adi, and Muhammad Sa‘aīd) is a village in Hayat Davud Rural District, in the Central District of Ganaveh County, Bushehr Province, Iran. At the 2006 census, its population was 1,374, in 289 families.

References 

Populated places in Ganaveh County